"N.Y. State of Mind" is a song by hip hop recording artist Nas from his debut studio album Illmatic (1994). The song's production was handled by DJ Premier who sampled two jazz songs: "Mind Rain" by Joe Chambers and "Flight Time" by Donald Byrd. Premier additionally scratched up vocal samples from Eric B. & Rakim's "Mahogany" for the song's hook. Nas raps two verses on the song in which he talks about his rapping talent and describes the dangerous environment that is the city of New York over a drum break sample of "N.T." by Kool & the Gang. Nas has attributed the song "Streets of New York" by Kool G Rap as one of the song's primary influences (Kool G Rap would later sample this song, and give Nas a guest spot on his album 4,5,6). A sequel to "N.Y. State of Mind" can be found on Nas' 1999 album I Am....

Background
DJ Premier revealed the creative process behind "N.Y. State of Mind":

"That was just amazing because it happened in this room. Actually, anything from '92 and on, we did it here. It was just amazing watching him work because I was already a fan of him when he did 'Back to the Grill', 'Halftime', 'It Ain't Hard to Tell', and 'Live at the Barbeque'. So when I heard him on those records I was like, 'Yo, I got to do something that's on the same level'. So I came in here. and flipped the ill, gutter, Joe Chambers sample. I can tell you because it's cleared. Nas watched me build the beat from scratch. And he wrote the verse in the studio. If you listen to 'N.Y. State of Mind' you’ll hear him going, 'I don’t know how to start this shit', because he literally just wrote it. Before he started the verse I was signaling him going, 'One, two, three', and he just goes in like, 'Rappers I monkey flip'em, in the funky rhythm". He did that in one take. After he did that first verse, he goes, 'How was that? Did that sound all right?' And we were just like, 'Oh, my God! The streets are going to go crazy when they hear this!'. It was one take, but he would format it before. He'll sit at the front, cover his mouth when the beat's playing, and would mumble it. So we can't hear what he's saying".

Legacy
"N.Y. State of Mind" ranks #74 on About.com's Top 100 Rap Songs.

Rolling Stone magazine ranked the song #31 on its list of "100 Greatest Hip-Hop Songs of All Time."

Marc L. Hill of PopMatters describes "N.Y. State of Mind" as a standout track on Illmatic claiming that it "provides as clear a depiction of ghetto life as a Gordon Parks photograph or a Langston Hughes poem." The song is also one of a few rap songs to be featured in the Norton Anthology of African American Literature. It is featured on Nas' 2007 greatest hits album as the only non-single song in the album, and on the 1999 compilation Best of D&D Studios, Vol. 1. Steve 'Flash' Juon of RapReviews.com states: 

The song is included on the soundtrack of video games True Crime: New York City and Saints Row 2, and was featured in Season 4 Episode 8 of the Netflix show Ozark, which borrowed it's title "Cousin of death" from a lyric in the song.

Certifications

References

External links
 

1994 songs
Nas songs
Songs about New York City
Song recordings produced by DJ Premier
Songs written by Nas
Hardcore hip hop songs
New York City hip hop
Songs written by DJ Premier